XHYK-FM 101.5 is a radio station in Conkal, Yucatán, Mexico, primarily serving Mérida. It is known as Xé'ek.

History
XEYK-AM 710 received its concession on September 8, 1978. Like its sister XHRRF-FM, it was part of Grupo Rivas, initially owned by Luis Alberto Rivas Aguilar, and it broadcast with 5,000 watts day and 250 night. In 1999, XEYK was sold to Radimágica de Yucatán, which in turn sold it in 2004 to Siglo XXI, a subsidiary of Grupo Radio México, in turn absorbed by GRC in 2016.

XEYK was cleared to migrate to FM in June 2010.

In late 2020, Grupo Radio Centro transferred operations of XHRRF and XHYK to Peninsula Studios. Both stations received new formats, with XHYK becoming "Xé'ek" (Mayan for "Mix"), airing a Latin music-focused adult hits format.

References

Radio stations in Yucatán
Grupo Radio Centro